Theodore Rask (born 1 May 2000) is a Swedish football defender who plays for Västerås SK, on loan from IFK Norrköping.

References

2000 births
Living people
People from Motala Municipality
Swedish footballers
Association football defenders
IF Sylvia players
IFK Norrköping players
Västerås SK Fotboll players
Ettan Fotboll players
Allsvenskan players
Superettan players